"Tonsil Trouble" is the first episode in the twelfth season of the American animated television series South Park, and the 168th episode of the series overall. Written and directed by series co-creator Trey Parker, it first aired on Comedy Central in the United States on March 12, 2008. In the episode, Cartman contracts HIV due to a botched blood transfusion. When Kyle laughs at Cartman's misfortune, Cartman intentionally infects Kyle with his disease as well. The episode was rated TV-MA L for strong language in the United States. In reruns, it later played with the tamer rating TV-14. The episode is a satire on the new and effective AIDS treatments that are inaccessible to the majority of the population suffering from or carrying the disease.

Plot 
While having his tonsils removed, the doctors accidentally infect Cartman with HIV from a blood donor. From this point on throughout the episode, Cartman dresses as Andrew Beckett, played by Tom Hanks in the movie Philadelphia. Upon hearing the news of Cartman's diagnosis, Kyle leaves the room and bursts out laughing because of all the years Cartman has constantly harassed Kyle. A special event is held for Cartman in which Elton John is expected to turn up and sing for him. It has low attendance, and Elton John does not show up. A waitress tells Cartman that people nowadays care more about cancer than AIDS. Jimmy Buffett performs instead, making Cartman angry.

The next day when Cartman asks why Stan, Kyle, and Kenny did not turn up, the former says they forgot and asks if Elton John sang for Cartman. He tells them what happened, making Kyle laugh so hard that he has to run home. Stan explains to Cartman that while Kyle truly feels bad for Cartman, he thinks it is ironic, and he deserves to be punished because he is always so horrible – especially to Kyle himself. Despite being told this, Cartman plots revenge by drawing some of his own blood with a syringe and putting it in Kyle's mouth as he sleeps with the help of an unsuspecting Butters. Cartman confesses he has sneaked into Kyle's room dozens of times.

When Kyle is diagnosed with HIV, he knows at once who is at fault, despite numerous suggestions that he contracted it through unprotected anal sex and blood transfusion. Enraged, he confronts Cartman in the playground and begins beating him up until Mr. Mackey breaks up the fight. The school authorities merely ask Cartman to apologize to Kyle for giving him HIV and Kyle to apologize for tattling about it.

Infuriated by this injustice, Kyle ignores Cartman's apology and goes straight to Cartman's house, telling Cartman that he intends to destroy everything he owns and his room in retaliation. When Kyle picks up Cartman's Xbox 360 to smash it, Cartman pleads with him, telling him that he has done research that leads him to believe that a cure for AIDS lies in Magic Johnson's longevity since becoming infected with HIV. Kyle and Cartman fly to Johnson's house after gaining free airline tickets by pretending to have "all-over" cancer because AIDS is seen as "too retro" a disease. During their trip together, Kyle becomes so impulsively annoyed by Cartman's constant repetition of the phrase "I'm not just sure, I'm HIV positive", ultimately screaming that neither AIDS nor dying is funny. Johnson is sympathetic toward the boys, offering assistance, but is unsure what he has in his house that helps. Upon investigation, Kyle and Cartman find that Johnson regularly sleeps with vast piles of cash in his bedroom because he does not trust banks; money eventually proves to be able to neutralize HIV. Laboratory scientists experiment with a concentrated dose of "about $180,000 shot directly into the bloodstream" on the boys, which disintegrates the HIV – implying that sufficiently allocated money could have solved the AIDS epidemic easily. Word spreads about the cure for AIDS, and an event is held at which Jimmy Buffett sings "CUREburger in Paradise". Volunteers inform poverty-stricken Africa that the fight against AIDS is over because all those suffering from the AIDS epidemic have to do now is inject themselves with piles of cash - which they do not have. After an unfortunate mix-up during the celebration in which the speaker addresses him and Cartman as "two brave lovers," Kyle tells Cartman he will break his Xbox anyway, prompting Cartman to run after him.

Reception
On its initial broadcast, the season premiere was watched by 3.07 million viewers in the United States.

The episode received generally mixed reviews with the consensus being that the episode "runs out of steam". Travis Fickett of IGN gave the episode a score of 7.2 out of 10 stating "It's a bit like South Park by the numbers,' as opposed to being truly inspired and insightful as the show's best episodes tend to be." Brad Trechak of TV Squad also gave a mixed review, saying that "Overall, a good show with some great one-liners. Sadly, it also had a weak ending." Fred of Tvoholic.com gave the episode a very positive review, praising the episode's message about AIDS.

Home release
"Tonsil Trouble", along with the thirteen other episodes from South Parks twelfth season, were released on a three-disc DVD set and two-disc Blu-ray set in the United States on March 10, 2009. The sets included brief audio commentaries by Parker and Stone for each episode, a collection of deleted scenes, and two special mini-features, The Making of 'Major Boobage and Six Days to South Park.

The episode is also included on the two-disc DVD collection The Cult of Cartman.

References

External links 

 "Tonsil Trouble" Full episode at South Park Studios
 

Television episodes about HIV/AIDS
Jimmy Buffett
Magic Johnson
South Park (season 12) episodes
Television episodes about prejudice and discrimination

it:Episodi di South Park (dodicesima stagione)#Problemi di tonsille